Arthur Allen II, also known as Major Allen (born ca. 1652, died June 15, 1710) was an American soldier and politician. During his life he served as a surveyor and was part of the Surry County militia. He was made a Major at some point between the fall of 1680 and the spring of the following year.

Personal life
Allen was born to Arthur and Alice Tucker Allen around 1652, likely at the family home in what would later become Surry County, Virginia. He was educated in England and after his father died in 1669, Allen inherited his father's estate, which included the Allen family house, now known as Bacon's Castle.

Allen later married the daughter of Lawrence Baker, Katherine Baker, with whom he had eight children. He died on June 15, 1710.

Political career
In the 1670s Allen began serving on the Lawnes Creek Parish and became a member of the Surry County Court. He was friends with Sir William Berkeley and was with the Governor when Allen's home was seized by followers of Nathaniel Bacon. While Allen was able to reclaim his home, Bacon's followers had caused a massive amount of damage to the property. Because of his close association with Berkeley, Allen was appointed to the quorum of the Surry County court in May 1677. Allen lost this office for about a year's span of time due to the actions of Lieutenant Governor Herbert Jeffreys, but regained it after the man's death.

Beginning in the 1680s Allen served several terms on the Virginia House of Burgesses. He was considered to be a man of influence and was twice elected to serve as the Speaker of the House. His service was occasionally met with resistance from Virginian leaders and on two occasions Governor Francis Howard dissolved the assembly because he saw Allen as one of his major opponents among the other burgess-elect.

In the 1691 assembly Allen was one of two burgess-elect that refused to take their seats due to a new oath of allegiance and supremacy that was written to recognize the rule of William III and Mary II following the Glorious Revolution. Allen did not subscribe to the oaths until the spring of 1702, after the death of James II. He sought re-election to the House of Burgesses in 1703, but was unsuccessful. Out of anger Allen tried to block the appointment of the winner, Thomas Swan, only for this to prompt an investigation into Allen's conduct.

References

1710 deaths
Virginia colonial people
House of Burgesses members
People from Surry County, Virginia